These tables list the dialing codes (area codes) for calling land lines for various cities and districts in Japan, when dialing from within Japan. The leading 0 is omitted when calling from outside Japan. Cell phones use the dialing codes of 070, 080 or 090. IP-based phone services use the 050 dialing code.

Aichi

Akita

Aomori

Chiba

Ehime

Fukui

Fukuoka

Fukushima

Gifu

Gunma

Hiroshima

Hokkaidō

Hyōgo

Ibaraki

Ishikawa

Iwate

Kagawa

Kagoshima

Kanagawa

Kōchi

Kumamoto

Kyoto

Mie

Miyagi

Miyazaki

Nagano

Nagasaki

Nara

Niigata

Ōita

Okayama

Okinawa

Osaka

Saga

Saitama

Shiga

Shimane

Shizuoka

Tochigi

Tokushima

Tokyo

Tottori

Toyama

Wakayama

Yamagata

Yamaguchi

Yamanashi

See also
Telephone numbers in Japan

References

ITU allocations list

External links
 Japan - City & Area Dialing Codes
 Japan International dialing code

Japan